Edwards County (county code ED) is a county located in the U.S. states of Kansas. As of the 2020 census, the county population was 2,907, Its county seat and most populous city is Kinsley. The county was founded in 1874 and named for W. C. Edwards, of Hutchinson, a pioneer settler, who played an active role in its organization.

Geography

Geographic Features
The Arkansas River flows through Edwards County from the southwest corner to the Pawnee County line near U.S. Route 56.

Major highways
Three U.S. Routes run through Edwards County, all meeting in Kinsley. An east–west route, U.S. Route 50 circumvents Belpre and Lewis before joining with westbound U.S. Route 56 in Kinsley. The single road then passes through Offerle and west into Ford County. U.S. Route 183 runs from Kiowa County in the south to Kinsley, where it joins eastbound U.S. 56, running as a single highway to Pawnee County. K-19 starts at U.S. Route 50 near Belpre, and travels north into Pawnee County.

Adjacent counties
 Pawnee County (north)
 Stafford County (east)
 Pratt County (southeast)
 Kiowa County (south)
 Ford County (southwest)
 Hodgeman County (northwest)

Demographics

As of the 2000 census, there were 3,449 people, 1,455 households, and 955 families residing in the county.  The population density was 6 people per square mile (2/km2).  There were 1,754 housing units at an average density of 3 per square mile (1/km2).  The racial makeup of the county was 92.52% White, 0.32% Black or African American, 0.49% Native American, 0.32% Asian, 5.57% from other races, and 0.78% from two or more races. Hispanic or Latino of any race were 9.71% of the population.

There were 1,455 households, out of which 28.70% had children under the age of 18 living with them, 56.30% were married couples living together, 6.00% had a female householder with no husband present, and 34.30% were non-families. 32.00% of all households were made up of individuals, and 17.30% had someone living alone who was 65 years of age or older.  The average household size was 2.33 and the average family size was 2.94.

In the county, the population was spread out, with 24.60% under the age of 18, 6.70% from 18 to 24, 25.10% from 25 to 44, 22.80% from 45 to 64, and 20.80% who were 65 years of age or older.  The median age was 41 years. For every 100 females there were 97.50 males.  For every 100 females age 18 and over, there were 95.80 males.

The median income for a household in the county was $30,530, and the median income for a family was $38,250. Males had a median income of $27,050 versus $20,132 for females. The per capita income for the county was $17,586.  About 7.00% of families and 10.40% of the population were below the poverty line, including 14.40% of those under age 18 and 8.00% of those age 65 or over.

Government

Presidential elections

Laws
Edwards County was a prohibition, or "dry", county until the Kansas Constitution was amended in 1986 and voters approved the sale of alcoholic liquor by the individual drink with a 30% food sales requirement.

Education

Unified school districts
 Kinsley-Offerle USD 347
 Lewis USD 502

Communities

Cities
 Belpre
 Kinsley (county seat) 
 Lewis
 Offerle

Unincorporated communities
 Centerview
 Fellsburg
 Nettleton
 Trousdale

Townships
Edwards County is divided into ten townships.  The city of Kinsley is considered governmentally independent and is excluded from the census figures for the townships.  In the following table, the population center is the largest city (or cities) included in that township's population total, if it is of a significant size.

See also

References

Further reading

 Standard Atlas of Edwards County, Kansas; Geo. A. Ogle & Co; 40 pages; 1906.

External links

County
 
 Edwards County - Directory of Public Officials
Maps
 Edwards County Maps: Current, Historic, KDOT
 Kansas Highway Maps: Current, Historic, KDOT
 Kansas Railroad Maps: Current, 1996, 1915, KDOT and Kansas Historical Society

 
Kansas counties
1874 establishments in Kansas
Populated places established in 1874